Scrobipalpa niveifacies is a moth in the family Gelechiidae. It was described by Povolný in 1977. It is found in southern Spain and Portugal.

The larvae feed on Atriplex halimus.

References

Scrobipalpa
Moths described in 1977
Taxa named by Dalibor Povolný